Brongniartella is a genus of red alga, named after French naturalist Adolphe Brongniart.

The genus was circumscribed by Jean Baptiste Bory de St. Vincent in Dict. Class. Hist. Nat. (Bory et al.) Vol.2 on page 516 in 1822.

References

Schmitz, C.J.F. (1893). "Die Gattung Lophothalia J.Ag" Ber. Dtsch. Bot. Ges. 11:212–32.

External links 
Taxonomic information for B. australis

Rhodomelaceae
Red algae genera